Tarzan and the Lost Safari is a 1957 action adventure film featuring Edgar Rice Burroughs' famous jungle hero Tarzan and starring Gordon Scott, Robert Beatty, Yolande Donlan and Betta St. John. Directed by H. Bruce Humberstone, it was the first Tarzan film released in color, Eastman Color. It was also MGM's first Tarzan film since 1942 and filmed in Nairobi, British East Africa. The character of Jane does not appear in this motion picture.

Plot
An airplane crashes in the jungle of the Kenya Colony of British East Africa in 1956, stranding passengers Gamage Dean (Yolande Donlan), Diana Penrod (Betta St. John), "Doodles" Fletcher (Wilfrid Hyde-White), Carl Kraski (George Coulouris), and Dick Penrod (Peter Arne). Before the plane slides into a gorge the group is rescued by Tarzan (Gordon Scott), who undertakes to lead them back to civilization.

Diana is kidnapped by warriors from Opar under Chief Ogonooro (Orlando Martins). The Oparians desire the strangers as sacrifices for their lion god. She is recovered by Tarzan and hunter Tusker Hawkins (Robert Beatty), whose advances Diana rebuffs. Secretly, however, Hawkins is in league with the Oparians, and plans to sell the castaways to the natives for a fortune in ivory.

Tarzan, rightly suspecting Hawkins' untrustworthiness, exposes his treachery. Now openly in league with the natives, the hunter helps them take the white party captive in Tarzan's absence. The ape man returns to save them before the sacrifice can take place, aided by his chimpanzee ally Cheeta, who sets fire to the native village. He then leads them to the safety of a nearby settlement.

Hawkins meets his fate at the hands of the Oparians, to whom Tarzan has signaled the villain's double-dealing by a creative use of jungle drums.

Cast
 Gordon Scott as Tarzan  
 Robert Beatty as Tusker Hawkins  
 Yolande Donlan as Gamage Dean  
 Betta St. John as Diana Penrod  
 Wilfrid Hyde-White as 'Doodles' Fletcher (as Wilfrid Hyde White)  
 George Coulouris as Carl Kraski  
 Peter Arne as Dick Penrod  
 Orlando Martins as Oparian Chieftain Ogonoore

Notes
The film contains more allusions to the Burroughs novels than usual for a Tarzan movie of the period, including the ape man's brief account of his origin to the female lead (which echoes Burroughs' version, however the she-ape who raised him is incorrectly identified as “Kerchak”). The film also uses Opar, though reducing the grand lost city as described by Burroughs to a generic native village. A male lion seen resting with Tarzan near the start of the film is referred to as “Numa”, a term used for male lions in the Burroughs series. Tarzan, while retaining his then-customary film characterization as an inarticulate simpleton, nevertheless displays considerable shrewdness and resource, foreshadowing the restoration in later movies of Burroughs' original concept of an intelligent, multitalented ape man.

Reception
According to MGM records the film earned $915,000 in the US and Canada and $1.4 million elsewhere, resulting in a profit of $432,000.

See also
 List of American films of 1957

References

External links
 
 Tarzan and the Lost Safari entry on "Down Memory Lane with Tarzan (Gordon Scott)"
 Tarzan and the Lost Safari entry on At-A-Glance Film Reviews
 ERBzine Silver Screen: Tarzan and the Lost Safari

1957 films
1950s action adventure films
1950s fantasy adventure films
American action adventure films
American fantasy adventure films
American sequel films
Films shot at Associated British Studios
Metro-Goldwyn-Mayer films
Films directed by H. Bruce Humberstone
Films scored by Clifton Parker
Films shot in Kenya
Films shot in Uganda
Tarzan films
Films produced by Sol Lesser
Color sequels of black-and-white films
1950s English-language films
1950s American films